Aaron Chen is an Australian comedian.

Aaron Chen may also refer to:
Aaron Chen, co-writer on The New Adventures of Nanoboy
Chen Chao-jung, Taiwanese actor